Alnabat (known as Əliismayıllı until 2011) is a village and municipality in the Gadabay Rayon of Azerbaijan.  It has a population of 1,295.

References 

Populated places in Gadabay District